Noon Khe is an Iranian comedy TV series portraying the life of a Kurdish family.
It ran for 3 seasons and ninety-eight episodes over the course of 3 years (2018–2020) premiering during each Nowruz, the Iranian New Year, with the exception of second season that began in the Ramazan of 2020. The comedy series is written by Amir Vafaee, and directed by Saeed Aghakhani who is also the main character in the series.

Plot
This series has a social story mixed with humor. Noureddin Khanzadeh (Saeed Agakhani) owns a workshop for processing sunflower seeds. Local farmers in Noureddine have sold their sunflower seeds to Noureddine. Noureddine sold this product to a person living in Tehran named Mirzaei so that he could sell these products in Turkey.
Meanwhile, it is reported that Mirzaei has passed away, and the farmers who learn of this news are somehow trying to extort money from him for the products they sold to Noureddin Khanzadeh.
During various conversations with Mirzaei's entourage, Noureddine also realizes that he was not in the middle of his life. The continuation of this story takes place in the second season of the series.

Cast 
 Saeed Aghakhani Nooreddin Khanzadeh (Seasons 1,2,3)
 Hamid Reza Azarang Halil Khanzade (Seasons 1,2,3)
 Ali Sadeghi (Season 1)
 Sirous Meimanat (Season 2)
 Hediyeh Bazvand Rojan Khanzadeh
 Neda Ghasemi Shirin Khanzade
 Hooman Haji Abdollahi (Season 1)
 Faride Sepahmansour (Season 1)
 Naeimeh Nezamdoost (Season 1)

References

External links
 

Iranian television series
2019 Iranian television series debuts
Persian-language television shows
Islamic Republic of Iran Broadcasting original programming
Television shows set in Iran